Wayne County is a county located in the U.S. state of North Carolina. As of the 2020 census, the population was 117,333. Its county seat is Goldsboro and it is home to Seymour Johnson Air Force Base.

Wayne County comprises the Goldsboro, NC Metropolitan Statistical Area.

History
Prior to 1730, Native Americans were the only known occupants of the territory now known as Wayne County. Settlers trickled into the territory, occupying land along the Neuse River. There was no general migration here until after 1750; as populations built up in the coastal areas, some settlers moved west for land.

Wayne County was established during the American Revolutionary War on November 2, 1779, from the western part of Dobbs County. It was named for "Mad Anthony" Wayne, a general in the war. The act establishing the County provided that the first court should be held at the home of Josiah Sasser, at which time the justices were to decide on a place for all subsequent courts until a courthouse could be erected. By 1782 the commissioners were named. In 1787 an act was passed establishing Waynesborough on the west side of the Neuse River, on the land of Doctor Andrew Bass. The courthouse was built here.

In 1855 parts of Wayne County, Edgecombe County, Johnston County, and Nash County were combined to form Wilson County.

Geography

Wayne County's surface is level to gently rolling uplands with broad bottoms along the rivers and some creeks. Elevations are predominantly 120 to 145 feet above sea level. The largest waterway, the Neuse River, bisects the lower central portion of the county and cuts a deep channel 20 to 40 feet deep as it flows in an eastward direction. Unusual river bluffs occur in the vicinity of Seven Springs. In addition to the Neuse River, the county is drained by the Little River, the Northeast Cape Fear River and numerous creeks.

Wayne County is underlain by unconsolidated beds of sand, clay and gravel. For the most part, these beds were deposited in seawater as the sea advanced and retreated during the geologic development of the Atlantic Coastal Plain. To a much lesser extent, streams deposited layers of sediment which mixed with that deposited on the sea floor.

The climate in Wayne County is characterized by warm summers and moderate winters. The average temperature is about 62 degrees. Annual precipitation is about 50 inches of rainfall per year, with the major portion occurring in the late spring and summer.

State and local protected areas/sites 
 Charles B. Aycock Birthplace
 Goldsborough Bridge Battlefield
 Cliffs of the Neuse State Park

Major water bodies 
 Bear Creek (North Fork Salt River tributary)
 Great Swamp
 Little River (Neuse River tributary)
 Juniper Swamp
 Nahunta Swamp
 Neuse River
 Northeast Cape Fear River
 Quaker Neck Lake
 Thoroughfare Swamp
 Water Branch (Richardson Creek tributary)

Adjacent counties
 Wilson County - north
 Greene County - east-northeast
 Lenoir County - east-southeast
 Duplin County - south
 Sampson County - southwest
 Johnston County - west

Major highways
  (Concurrency with US 70)
 
 
 
 
 
 
 
 
 
 
 
 
  (Connecter Route)
The main highway in Wayne County is US 70, which offers access to the North Carolina coast, the capital city of Raleigh  and I-95. The only interstate in Wayne County is I-795, which is a direct connector with I-95 and US 264. US 70 has been designated as Future Interstate 42.

Major infrastructure 
 Goldsboro Union Station
 Seymour Johnson Air Force Base

Demographics

2020 census

As of the 2020 United States census, there were 117,333 people, 48,482 households, and 30,990 families residing in the county.

2000 census
As of the census of 2000, there were 113,329 people, 42,612 households, and 30,254 families residing in the county.  The population density was 205 people per square mile (79/km2).  There were 47,313 housing units at an average density of 86 per square mile (33/km2).  The racial makeup of the county was 61.28% White, 33.02% Black or African American, 0.36% Native American, 0.96% Asian, 0.05% Pacific Islander, 3.07% from other races, and 1.25% from two or more races.  4.94% of the population were Hispanic or Latino of any race.

There were 42,612 households, out of which 34.70% had children under the age of 18 living with them, 51.60% were married couples living together, 15.40% had a female householder with no husband present, and 29.00% were non-families. 24.50% of all households were made up of individuals, and 9.00% had someone living alone who was 65 years of age or older.  The average household size was 2.55 and the average family size was 3.03.

In the county, the population was spread out, with 26.20% under the age of 18, 9.90% from 18 to 24, 30.50% from 25 to 44, 21.90% from 45 to 64, and 11.60% who were 65 years of age or older.  The median age was 35 years. For every 100 females there were 97.30 males.  For every 100 females age 18 and over, there were 94.30 males.

The median income for a household in the county was $33,942, and the median income for a family was $40,492. Males had a median income of $28,396 versus $21,854 for females. The per capita income for the county was $17,010.  About 10.20% of families and 13.80% of the population were below the poverty line, including 18.60% of those under age 18 and 15.20% of those age 65 or over.

Government and politics
Wayne was historically a typical "Solid South" county for the first two thirds of the twentieth century, as conservative white Democrats had passed a new constitution at the turn of the 20th century that disenfranchised most blacks. North Carolina became a virtually one-party state, with whites generally voting for Democratic Party Candidates.

Following Congressional passage of major civil rights legislation in the mid-1960s, this county's white voters, like most across the South, gradually started to support Republican national candidates and ultimately changed parties, joining the Republicans. But in 1968, they voted for segregationist "American Independent" George Wallace. Since 1972, the white majority of Wayne County has carried it for Republican presidential candidates in every election.

Wayne County is governed by a commissioner-manager system, consisting of seven members elected to four-year terms. One commissioner is elected from each of six single-member districts in the county and one is elected at-large countywide. All seven members serve concurrent four-year terms. The partisan elections for the Board of Commissioners are held in November in even-numbered years. The Board elects a Chairman and Vice-Chairman from among its members annually at the first meeting in December. The Board meets on the first and third Tuesday each month.

These are the elected officials representing Wayne County following the 2020 elections.

Wayne County will be represented in the 13th District in the United States House of Representatives, the 4th District in the North Carolina State House of Representatives, and the 4th and 10th District in the North Carolina State Senate due to the 2020 redistricting cycle.

Wayne County is a member of the regional Eastern Carolina Council of Governments.

Economy
Wayne County's local industries are involved in a range of operations from simple assembly to complex manufacturing processes resulting in products ranging from bread and poultry feed to automobile parts and electric transformers. Substantial technological improvements in recent years involving modernization of plant facilities and the addition of sophisticated manufacturing equipment have resulted in enhanced profitability and productivity for many of the local manufacturing firms.

The combination of a mild climate, a freeze-free growing season of about 225 days and a wide range of soil types contribute to a highly productive agricultural area. Total gross farm sales in Wayne County in 2006 was approximately US$329,082,138. Field crops, including the primary crops of tobacco, corn, cotton, soybeans, and wheat accounted for nearly 12% of the farm income or US$38,583,389.

Income from livestock and poultry production was US$236,287,547 in 2006 and derived primarily from swine operations. Swine production has increased rapidly, making it the single largest source of farm income. In 2006 farm income from swine production was US$75,409,690 or 23% of all farm income. Wayne County ranks 7th in the nation for production of swine.

Seymour Johnson Air Force Base is home to the 4th Fighter Wing and 916th Air Refueling Wing. The annual civilian and military payroll is over $282 millionUSD. In fiscal year 2006 the economic impact at the base totaled over $460 millionUSD.

Education
Wayne County is home to three colleges: Wayne Community College, University of Mount Olive (formerly known as Mount Olive College), and the Goldsboro campus of the North Carolina Wesleyan College.

Public schools are administered by the Wayne County Public Schools system. The public schools include nine high schools and college preparation schools, nine middle schools, fourteen elementary schools and one special education school. The county is also home to one charter public school and six private schools.

High schools
 Charles B. Aycock High School
 Eastern Wayne High School
 Goldsboro High School
 Rosewood High School
 Southern Wayne High School
 Spring Creek High School
 Wayne Early/Middle College High School
 Wayne Middle/High Academy
 Wayne School of Engineering

Middle schools
 Brogden Middle School
 Dillard Middle School
 Eastern Wayne Middle School
 Grantham Middle School
 Greenwood Middle School
 Mount Olive Middle School
 Norwayne Middle School
 Rosewood Middle School
 Spring Creek Middle School

Elementary schools
 Brogden Primary School
 Carver Elementary School
 Carver Heights Elementary School
 Eastern Wayne Elementary School
 Fremont Stars Elementary School
 Grantham Elementary School
 Meadow Lane Elementary School
 North Drive Elementary School
 Northeast Elementary School
 Northwest Elementary School
 Rosewood Elementary School
 School Street Early Learning Center
 Spring Creek Elementary School
 Tommy's Road Elementary School

Special Education Schools
 Edgewood Community Developmental School

Private schools
 Faith Christian Academy
 Pathway Christian Academy
 Wayne Christian School
 Wayne Country Day School
 St. Mary Catholic School
 Wayne Preparatory Academy

Media
 NewOldNorth.com
 The Goldsboro News-Argus
 Goldsboro Daily News
 The Buzz Around Wayne County
 Mount Olive Tribune
 Wayne-Wilson News Leader
 WGBR 98.3 FM/1150 AM — Classic Hits
 WFMC 105.7 FM/730 AM — Gospel
 WZKT 97.7 FM — Katie Country
 WSSG 92.7 FM/1300 AM — Hip Hop & R&B
 “Eastbound & Downtown” magazine

Hospitals
 Wayne UNC Health Care, a medical facility located in Goldsboro, is the county's second-largest employer.
 Cherry Hospital is a psychiatric hospital located in Goldsboro; it was founded in 1880 as a facility to treat mentally ill African Americans when all public facilities were segregated. A museum depicting its history is part of the hospital campus.
 O'Berry Neuro-Medical Center is a North Carolina Department of Health and Human Services hospital providing rehabilitative services to the mentally retarded and people with developmental disabilities.

Communities

City
 Goldsboro (county seat and largest city)

Towns
 Eureka
 Fremont
 Mount Olive
 Seven Springs
 Pikeville

Villages
 Walnut Creek

Census-designated places
 Brogden
 Dudley
 Elroy
 Mar-Mac
 New Hope

Other unincorporated communities
 Faro
 Grantham
 Hopewell
 Nahunta
 Rosewood

Townships

 Brogden
 Buck Swamp
 Fork
 Fremont
 Goldsboro
 Grantham
 Hood Swamp
 Indian Springs
 Nahunta
 New Hope
 Pikeville
 Saulston
 Stoney Creek

Notable people
 Ike Atkinson, drug trafficker
 Charles Brantley Aycock, politician
 Bob Boyd, golfer
 Moira Crone, author
 Ava Gardner, actress
 Anne Jeffreys, actress
 Carl Kasell, radio personality
 Martin Lancaster, former President of the North Carolina Community College System
 Manny Lawson, NFL linebacker
 Jerry Narron, MLB player, coach, and manager
 Tony Schiffman, jeweler
 John R. Smith, politician
 Michale Spicer, NFL defensive end
 Greg Warren, NFL long snapper
 James B. Whitfield, lawyer
 Cadmus M. Wilcox, Confederate general

See also
 List of North Carolina counties
 National Register of Historic Places listings in Wayne County, North Carolina
 Kinston Regional Jetport, closest airport to Wayne County
 North Carolina State Parks
 List of future Interstate Highways
 1961 Goldsboro B-52 crash, plane crash involving a Boeing B-52 Stratofortress carrying 3-4 nuclear bombs near Goldsboro

References

External links

 
 

 
1779 establishments in North Carolina
Populated places established in 1779